Kaul Singh Thakur (born 23 November 1945) was the Health and Family Welfare minister in Himachal Pradesh Cabinet until December, 2017. He has also served as the Himachal Pradesh Congress President two times.

He has also served as the PCC president a second time in a row, despite strong opposition from leaders such as Virbhadra Singh and Vidya Stokes. He was also looked upon by many as a potential chief ministerial candidate for the 2012 Himachal Vidhan Sabha elections.

Early life
Thakur was born on 23 November 1945 in Mandi district to Shri Laxman Singh Thakur. He was educated at Punjab University, Chandigarh. He is married to Chinta Thakur and they have one son and three daughters.

Politics
He started his political career as a member of the Panchayat Samiti, Mandi Sadar. He was elected its chairman in 1973 and remained at the post till 1977. He did many developmental works at Panchayat level. He was elected to the State Legislative Assembly for the first time in the year of 1977. Also remained Deputy Chairman, State Planning Board (Cabinet rank), 1983; Minister of State for Health & Family Welfare, Parliamentary Affairs & Law (Independent Charge), 1985–90; Speaker, Vidhan Sabha, 1993–98; and Minister for Irrigation & Public Health, Law & Justice, Urban Development & Parliamentary Affairs, 6 March 2003 to December, 2007. 
As Speaker participated in various Annual All India Presiding Officers' as well as CPA Conferences held from time to time.  
Started political career as a Member, Panchayat Samiti, Mandi Sadar and unanimously elected its chairman, 1973–77; joined Congress for Democracy and Janata party before being associated with Congress (I) in 1979; remained Chairman, Pradesh Congress Committee' Legal Cell; General Secretary; Congress; Legislative Party' and (ii) State Congress Committee (twice).  
Elected to Legislative Assembly in 1977; re-elected to the Assembly in 1982, 1985, 1993, 1998, 2003, 2007 and 2012 on Congress ticket.  
Remained Chairman: Committee on Subordinate Legislation (two years) and ii) Estimates Committee' (four years; headed a high powered State level' Accident Enquiry Committee' constituted by State Government adjudged as best Parliamentarian during 1998–2003; awarded cash prize of Rs. 51000/- and appreciation letter by Commonwealth Parliamentary Association, Himachal Pradesh.  
Also remained Deputy Chairman, State Planning Board (Cabinet rank), 1983; Minister of State for Health & Family Welfare, Parliamentary Affairs & Law (Independent Charge), 1985–90; Speaker' Vidhan Sabha, 1993–98; and Minister for Irrigation & Public Health' Law & Justice; Urban Development & Parliamentary Affairs, 6 March 2003 to December, 2007.  
Elected to State Assembly for the 8th time in December 2012.

Lost to Jawahar Thakur of the BJP in 2017 assembly elections.

References

 

People from Mandi district
Living people
Indian National Congress politicians
1945 births
Himachal Pradesh MLAs 2007–2012
Himachal Pradesh MLAs 2012–2017
Speakers of the Himachal Pradesh Legislative Assembly